ALL4ONE Challenge is a French-German yacht racing team that competes in International America's Cup Class races. The team has formerly competed as K-Challenge and between 2005 and 2007 they were known as Areva Challenge.

History
As Areva Challenge they participated in the Louis Vuitton Cup 2007, the challenger series held prior to the 32nd America's Cup. They were eliminated in the Round Robin phase.

They also competed in the Louis Vuitton Pacific Series in 2009 and are part of the Louis Vuitton Trophy, hosting the Louis Vuitton Trophy - Nice event.

References

External links
Official Website

America's Cup teams
Extreme Sailing Series teams
2001 establishments in France